Monica Theodorescu (born 2 March 1963) is a German retired equestrian and dressage rider.

Biography 
Born in Halle, North Rhine-Westphalia, Monica Theodorescu is the daughter of the German, former Romanian, dressage rider George Theodorescu and the German show jumping rider Inge Theodorescu (born as Inge Fellgiebel). Inge Fellgiebel was the daughter of Hans Fellgiebel, the brother of Erich Fellgiebel, a "July 20th" conspirator. Monica was successful for 30 years as a rider in the international world of dressage. Her last team medal came at the European Championships at Windsor, England, in 2009. 

In 2012, German Olympic Equestrian Committee appointed Theodorescu the new German dressage team trainer.

References

External links 

 Profile of Monica Theodorescu at Horsemagazine.com
 Monica Theodorescu at Olympic.org
 Monica Theodorescu International Federation for Equestrian Sports

German dressage riders
Olympic equestrians of West Germany
Olympic equestrians of Germany
German female equestrians
Equestrians at the 1988 Summer Olympics
Equestrians at the 1992 Summer Olympics
Equestrians at the 1996 Summer Olympics
Olympic gold medalists for West Germany
Olympic gold medalists for Germany
Olympic medalists in equestrian
Dressage trainers
German people of Romanian descent
Living people
1963 births
Medalists at the 1996 Summer Olympics
Medalists at the 1992 Summer Olympics
Medalists at the 1988 Summer Olympics
People from Halle (Westfalen)
Sportspeople from Detmold (region)